miu-clips is a musical project created in 2006 by Yoshifumi Ato. Their debut album, Rhythm of My Heart, was released in 2009.

The project's frontman, composer, guitarist, keyboardist and record producer is Yoshifumi Ato.

Discography

Studio albums
 Rhythm of My Heart - April 1, 2009

Other albums
 LOVE IT - November 4, 2009
 L.O.V.E. - November 17, 2010

Compilation albums
 Playlist ONE - October 7, 2009

EPs
 L.O.V.E. - EP - April 15, 2010

Production discography
The following is a list of songs produced, co-produced and remixed by miu-clips.

Productions
 autumn leave's - turn to me - Definite Collections -(Album) - March 28, 2009
 V.A. - Funny Walk In Old Fashion / Lupin The Third DANCE&DRIVE official covers&remixes(Album) - August 26, 2009
 Lena Fujii - Pon de Replay / Rainbow(EP) - November 4, 2009
 Harumi Tsuyuzaki - Love Flame / Now Playing(Album) - April 20, 2011
 Harumi Tsuyuzaki - You Lied / Now Playing(Album) - April 20, 2011
 Fox Capture Plan - FLEXIBLE(Album) - October 10, 2012
 Sweets Girls Project - Sweets Girls –Twinkle Day-(Album) - March 13, 2013
 Sweets Girls Project - Sweets Girls –Eternal Love-(Album) - January 15, 2014
 Skoop On Somebody - Beautiful Sound(EP) - April 8, 2015

Remixes
 Jilty Soul - La Festa(Miu-Clips Remix) / Play Loud(Album) - November 12, 2008
 COLDFEET - It’s All About You (autumn leave’s remix album ver.) /TEN remixes(Album) - August 5, 2009
 COLDFEET - Rain Come Down (miu-clips remix) /TEN remixes(Album) - August 5, 2009
 Lena Fujii - Black Cinderella (miu-clips Remix) / Rainbow(EP) - November 4, 2009
 BLU-SWING - Feelin' Blue (miu-clips remix) / Feelin' Blue(EP) - December 8, 2010
 JABBERLOOP feat. Yoshika (from SOULHEAD) - Dear Santa (miu-clips remix) / Dear Santav(EP) - December 8, 2010
 M-Swift - Key of Love (miu-clips Remix) / Key of Love(EP) - March 2, 2011
 Gordon Chambers - Lead Me (miu-clips Remix) / Sincere Dance Edition(Album) - June 6, 2012

Compilation albums
 Flavor Bossa Case IV - December 20, 2006
 Flavor Bossa Case White Style - April 17, 2007
 Flavor Groove Case Summer Style - August 8, 2007
 Flavor Jazzy Soul Style - October 1, 2008

External links
Official website
Nippon Culumbia (Japanese)

Japanese pop music groups
Japanese composers